Zlata Leonidivna Ognevich (born Inna Leonidivna Bordiuh, 12 January 1986) is a Ukrainian singer and former politician. She represented Ukraine in the Eurovision Song Contest 2013 in Malmö with the song "Gravity", placing third. Ognevich previously attempted to represent Ukraine at the contest in 2010 and 2011.

In 2014, Ognevich was elected to the Verkhovna Rada for the Radical Party using her birth name Inna Bordiuh. She resigned from parliament after one year, citing her opposition to the corruption she had witnessed. She has been vocal in her support for Ukrainian forces during the pro-Russian unrest in Ukraine, and announced she would not accept Russian citizenship following the annexation of Crimea, where Ognevich was raised.

Early life
Ognevich was born in 1986 in Murmansk to Ukrainian parents; she is of Italian and Serbian descent; she has Italian ancestors on her mother's side and Serbian on her father's side. She grew up in the Crimean city of Sudak. At age 18, Ognevich moved to Kyiv, where she currently resides, to pursue a higher music education. Ognevich is a graduate of Kyiv's Rheingold M. Glière Music College. During her third year at Rheingold, she began working with live bands and did her own promotional work.

Ognevich in interviews has claimed she has lived in "many cities and countries".

Musical career
Ognevich is a soloist of the Ensemble of Song and Dance of the Ukrainian Armed Forces.

2010: Eurovision Song Contest 2010
Ognevich made her first attempt to enter the Eurovision Song Contest with Ukraine. Her song was "Tiny Island", which finished fifth with 30 points.

2010–2011: Eurovision Song Contest 2011
In 2011, she made her second unsuccessful attempt to represent Ukraine in the contest. This time the song was in the Ukrainian language. Her song was "The Kukushka" which finished second.

Following complaints from viewers about the voting procedure in that years final, a new final was to be held on 3 March 2011. However, after Jamala and Ognevich withdrew from this new final in the days before it was scheduled to be held, Mika Newton became the artist to represent Ukraine.

2012–2014: Eurovision Song Contest 2013 and Junior Eurovision hosting

On 23 December 2012, Ognevich made her third attempt to represent Ukraine at the Eurovision Song Contest, by entering the Ukrainian national selection Evrobachennya 2013 - Natsionalyni vidbir with the song "Gravity". After scoring maximum points from both the jury and televote, Ognevich won the right to represent Ukraine at the Eurovision Song Contest 2013 in Malmö, Sweden.
 
At the competition, Ukraine qualified from the first semi-final on 14 May 2013, placing third in a field of 16 songs and scoring 140 points. In the final, Ognevich and "Gravity" placed third, scoring 214 points and receiving 12 points from Armenia, Azerbaijan, Belarus, Croatia and Moldova.

Ognevich hosted the Junior Eurovision Song Contest 2013 on 30 November along with Timur Miroshnychenko. Ognevich announced the voting results from Ukraine during the Eurovision Song Contest 2014. In August 2014, Ognevich released her own version of Ukraine's national anthem "Shche ne vmerla Ukraina".

Political career
In the 2014 Ukrainian parliamentary election on 26 October, Ognevich was a candidate (as a non-partisan candidate she placed 4th on the party list) of Radical Party. According to Radical Party leader Oleh Lyashko, Ognevich was on the party list because "I understand that in the imagination of people a parliamentarian is jowly, paunchy, old, sick and stupid. I want in Parliament young, smart, beautiful". In the election, her party won twenty two seats and thus Ognevich was elected into parliament. In parliament, she focused on cultural and copyright issues. Ognevich was present at 57% of all parliamentary sessions during her tenure in parliament.

On 10 November 2015, Ognevich submitted a letter of resignation to parliament. In her resignation speech to parliament on the same day, she stated; "Now I see that when there is no culture it’s easier to rule and manipulate people. That’s why in these circumstances, as cultural activist, I’m not helpful to this parliament…". In the speech, she also accused her former colleagues of serving lobbyist interests and not the general public.

Personal life
Five months after the March 2014 annexation of Crimea by Russia, Ognevich called the annexation "a very painful tragedy" and stated that her parents, who continue to live in Crimea, would not obtain Russian citizenship.

During the 2014 pro-Russian conflict in Ukraine Ognevich and fellow Ukrainian singer Anastasia Prikhodko raised money for the 72nd Guards Mechanized Brigade.

Discography

Singles

Notes

References

External links

Official website

1986 births
21st-century Ukrainian women singers
Eighth convocation members of the Verkhovna Rada
English-language singers from Ukraine
Eurovision Song Contest entrants of 2013
Living people
People from Murmansk
Pro-Ukrainian people of the 2014 pro-Russian unrest in Ukraine
Radical Party of Oleh Liashko politicians
Russian emigrants to Ukraine
Eurovision Song Contest entrants for Ukraine
Ukrainian pop musicians
21st-century Ukrainian women politicians
Ukrainian LGBT rights activists
Ukrainian people of Italian descent
Ukrainian people of Serbian descent
R. Glier Kyiv Institute of Music alumni
Women members of the Verkhovna Rada